Vasylivka is a village in Yasynuvata Raion (district) in Donetsk Oblast of eastern Ukraine,  north-northeast from the centre of Donetsk city.

The settlement was taken under control of pro-Russian forces during the War in Donbass, that started in 2014.

Demographics
In 2001, the settlement had 371 inhabitants. Native language distribution as of the Ukrainian Census of 2001:
Ukrainian: 29.92%
Russian: 70.08%

References

Villages in Pokrovsk Raion